Purulia Lok Sabha constituency is one of the present 42 Lok Sabha constituencies in West Bengal state in eastern India. India has total 543 Lok Sabha (parliamentary) constituencies. All the seven assembly segments of No. 35 Purulia Lok Sabha constituency are in Purulia district.

Assembly segments

As per order of the Delimitation Commission issued in 2006 in respect of the delimitation of constituencies in the West Bengal, parliamentary constituency no. 35 Purulia is composed of the following segments:

Prior to delimitation, Purulia Lok Sabha constituency was composed of the following assembly segments:Bandwan (ST) (assembly constituency no. 233), Manbazar (assembly constituency no. 234), Balarampur (ST) (assembly constituency no. 235), Arsha (assembly constituency no. 236), Jhalda (assembly constituency no. 237), Joypur (assembly constituency no. 238), Purulia (assembly constituency no. 239)

Members of Parliament

 Both the constituencies were in Bihar at the time of election.

Election results

General election 2019

General election 2014

General election 2009

General election 1957-2004

See also
 Purulia district
 List of Constituencies of the Lok Sabha in West Bengal

References

External links
Purulia lok sabha  constituency election 2019 result details

Lok Sabha constituencies in West Bengal
Politics of Purulia district
Purulia